Live in Cologne is a posthumous live album by the Jimi Hendrix Experience. Released on November 27, 2012, the album documents the band's performance at the Sporthalle in Cologne, Germany,  on January 13, 1969. It is the twelfth entry in the Dagger Records catalogue of official bootlegs released by the Experience Hendrix company and was originally released in LP record format only; a CD version was issued in July 2013.

Track listing

Personnel

Musical personnel
Jimi Hendrixguitar, vocals
Mitch Mitchelldrums
Noel Reddingbass guitar
Production personnel
Janie Hendrix – production
John McDermott – production, liner notes
Eddie Kramer – production
George Marino – mastering

Artwork personnel
Phil Yarnall – design
Jeremy Ross – photography
Greg Smith – photography
Christian Spindler – photography
Mark Johansen – photography

References

2012 live albums
Jimi Hendrix live albums
Dagger Records live albums
Live albums published posthumously